The 1998–99 NBA season was the 32nd season for the Seattle SuperSonics in the National Basketball Association. On March 23, 1998, the owners of all 29 NBA teams voted 27–2 to reopen the league's collective bargaining agreement, seeking changes to the league's salary cap system, and a ceiling on individual player salaries. The National Basketball Players Association (NBPA) opposed to the owners' plan, and wanted raises for players who earned the league's minimum salary. After both sides failed to reach an agreement, the owners called for a lockout, which began on July 1, 1998, putting a hold on all team trades, free agent signings and training camp workouts, and cancelling many NBA regular season and preseason games. Due to the lockout, the NBA All-Star Game, which was scheduled to be played in Philadelphia on February 14, 1999, was also cancelled. However, on January 6, 1999, NBA commissioner David Stern, and NBPA director Billy Hunter finally reached an agreement to end the lockout. The deal was approved by both the players and owners, and was signed on January 20, ending the lockout after 204 days. The regular season began on February 5, and was cut short to just 50 games instead of the regular 82-game schedule.

During the off-season, the Sonics signed free agents Billy Owens and former Sonics center Olden Polynice, and acquired Don MacLean from the New Jersey Nets. The Sonics got off to a strong start under new head coach Paul Westphal, winning their first six games. However, they soon fell apart losing nine of their next twelve games as Vin Baker played just 34 games due to thumb and knee injuries. Owens and MacLean both missed large parts of the season also due to injuries. From there, the Sonics would play around .500 for the remainder of the season finishing fifth in the Pacific Division with a 25–25 record, losing a tie-breaker for the #8 seed in the Western Conference to the Minnesota Timberwolves, and missing the playoffs for the first time since 1990.

Gary Payton averaged 21.7 points, 8.7 assists and 2.2 steals per game, and was named to the All-NBA Second Team, and to the NBA All-Defensive First Team, while Detlef Schrempf averaged 15.0 points and 7.4 rebounds per game, and Baker provided the team with 13.8 points and 6.2 rebounds per game. In addition, sixth man Dale Ellis contributed 10.3 points per game off the bench, while Hersey Hawkins provided with 10.3 points and 1.6 steals per game, MacLean contributed 10.9 points per game in only just 17 games, Owens provided with 7.8 points in only just 21 games, and Polynice averaged 7.7 points and 8.9 rebounds per game. Payton also finished in ninth place in Most Valuable Player voting, and in third place in Defensive Player of the Year voting.

Following the season, Schrempf signed as a free agent with the Portland Trail Blazers, while Hawkins was traded to the Chicago Bulls, Polynice signed with the Utah Jazz, and Ellis, Owens and MacLean were all traded to the Orlando Magic. However, all three players would never play for the Magic, as Ellis was traded to the Milwaukee Bucks, Owens was dealt to the Philadelphia 76ers, and MacLean was sent to the Houston Rockets in a three-team trade, but was released to free agency.

Draft picks

Roster

Regular season

Season standings

z – clinched division title
y – clinched division title
x – clinched playoff spot

Record vs. opponents

Game log

Player statistics

NOTE: Please write the players statistics in alphabetical order by last name.

Season

Awards and records

Awards
 Gary Payton, All-NBA Second Team
 Gary Payton, NBA All-Defensive First Team

Records

Transactions

Trades

Free agents

Additions

Subtractions

References

See also
 1998–99 NBA season

Seattle SuperSonics seasons